For Love of You is a 1933 British musical comedy film directed by Carmine Gallone and starring Arthur Riscoe, Naunton Wayne and Franco Foresta. It was made at British and Dominions Elstree Studios. It is the sequel to Going Gay.

The film's sets were designed by the art director R. Holmes Paul.

Cast
 Arthur Riscoe as Jack  
 Naunton Wayne as Jim  
 Franco Foresta as The Tenor  
 Diana Napier as The Wife 
 Pearl Osgood as The Girl 
 Valerie Hobson as Minor Role

References

Bibliography
 Low, Rachael. Filmmaking in 1930s Britain. George Allen & Unwin, 1985.
 Wood, Linda. British Films, 1927-1939. British Film Institute, 1986.

External links

1933 films
1933 musical comedy films
Films directed by Carmine Gallone
British musical comedy films
Films shot at Imperial Studios, Elstree
Films set in Venice
1930s British films